Clivina anthracina is a species of ground beetle in the subfamily Scaritinae. It was described by Johann Christoph Friedrich Klug in 1862.

References

anthracina
Beetles described in 1862